Ilkka Taneli Kuusisto (born 26 April 1933) is a Finnish composer of popular opera and father of Jaakko Kuusisto and Pekka Kuusisto. He was born in Helsinki, and was the general manager of the Finnish National Opera between 1984 and 1992.

Works

Orchestral 

Symphony No.1 (1998)
Concertino improvvisando for violin & small orchestra (2006)

Vocal work(s) 

Kun talo alkaa soida (When the House Begins to Resound) for baritone & orchestra (1992)

Operas
Muumiooppera (1974)
Miehen kylkiluu (1977)
Sota valosta (1980)
Jääkäri Ståhl (1981)
Pierrot ja yön salaisuudet (1991)
Postineiti (1992)
Neiti Julie (1994)
Gabriel, tule takaisin! (1998)
Isänmaan tyttäret (1998)
Nainen kuin jäätynyt samppanja (1999)
Kuninkaan sormus (2000)
Pula! (2002)
Matilda ja Nikolai (2003)
Kotia kohti (2006)
Vapauden vanki (2006)
Taipaleenjoki (2009)

Film music 

Rakkaus alkaa aamuyöstä (1966)

References

External links 

 Ilkka Kuusisto on Music Finland

1933 births
Living people
People from Helsinki
Finnish classical composers
Finnish opera composers
Male opera composers
Finnish male classical composers
20th-century Finnish composers
20th-century Finnish male musicians
20th-century classical composers
21st-century classical composers
21st-century Finnish male musicians
21st-century Finnish composers